Dirk Adamiak (born 1970), better known by his stage name Blutonium Boy, is a hardstyle producer and DJ from Germany. He started playing as a DJ in 1988.

Career 
In 1986, Blutonium Boy began his DJ career in a small club in southern Germany, which he left in 1988. In the same year he played in front of 2,500 visitors and received the first booking requests from abroad. In 1997, he founded the record label Blutonium Records, where he released his first work Dreams in my Fantasy, as DJ Session One. The worldwide marketing via EastWest (Warner) with airplay on Viva helped him to the breakthrough.

In the following years Blutonium Records developed into the Blutonium Media Germany Group, which has now published more than 170 works with several sub-labels and operates a social network for musicians under the name Blupile.

In November 2008 EMI Germany released a best-of-hardstyle, which includes four mixed CDs from the repertoire of Blutonium Records. In collaboration with EMI, a series of hardstyle compilations under the name Blutonium Presents Hardstyle was released in Germany and Australia.

In the summer of 2009, Blutonium Boy announced that his career as a hardstyle DJ temporarily paused. His compositional Hardstyle series is directed by the Dutch Hardstyle duo Showtek. Hardstyle Vol. 18 was the last compilation he created.

Since July 17, 2012, Blutonium Boy has officially returned and released the single Hardstyle Instructor is back with this date and was also responsible for the compilation Hardstyle 10 Years released on November 23, in 2013 the compilation series Hardstyle with Hardstyle Vol 26, which was previously continued by Showtek, is continued.

On June 21, 2013 Blutonium Boy played in EDC (Las Vegas) on the BassCon stage

Blutonium Records
Adamiak founded Blutonium Records in 1996, which up to 2011 produced 160 releases. Blutonium Records later became a division of Blutonium Media Germany, with 6 sublabels. The sublabels are Blutonium Traxx, Dance 2 Trance, Pumping Trance, Q-Asar, Trianon Records and BAM Recordings. Since Blutonium Records isn't producing trance anymore, but hardstyle, the production of trance is in the hands of the sublabels. In December 2005 Blutonium Records released its 100th vinyl.

Discography

Albums 
 Hardstyle Dimension
 Essential Of Hardstyle Vol. 1-5
 Essential Of Hardstyle Vol. 6
 Early Hardstyle 100 Vol. 1
 Hardstyle Is My Life

Singles and EPs 
 Brainshooter
 Trancin Your Mind
 Higher Level (feat. DJ Neo)
 Go Burn A Fatty Ass (feat. Thomas Trouble)
 Make It Loud
 Hardstyle Nation (feat. DJ Neo)
 Hardstyle Instructor
 Paranoid (feat. DJ Virus)
 Follow Me
 Hardstyle Instructor Part 2
 Hard Creation (feat. DJ Virus)
 Floorkilla (feat. DJ Pavo)
 Bullshit (feat. Max B. Grant)
 Legalize (feat. John Ferris)
 Make It Louder
 Alarma (feat. Thomas Trouble)
 Acid & Bass
 Hardstyle And Acid (feat. John Ferris)
 Hardstyle Rockers / Supreme (feat. DJ Pila)
 Inferno / To The Bassline (feat. Romeo Must Die)
 This Is My Floor (feat. DJ Pavo)
 Acid Over Sydney / Back
 In Touch With Tomorrow / Kick This M.F.
 Dark Angel (Remix EP)
 Dark Angel / Hardstyle Instructor Returns
 Blackout / Fear (feat. Luna)
 Use Me / XTC
 Hardstyle Superstar / eBeat
 Sound Like This / Euphobia
 Play This Song PTS
 Echoes 2009 (feat. Pavo)
 All Your Bass 2010 (feat. Flarup)
 USMHF
 Make It Loud 2012 (incl. Headhunterz Remix)
 New York New York / Survivor
 US Hardstyle MF**
 Hardstyle Instructur Is Back
 Holding Out For A Hero (feat. Bonnie Tyler)
 Dancing For Love
 I AM (feat. Raw Editors & Audionator)
 Reverze Bass
 Spooky Melo
 Where Did I Go (feat. Eric Bazilian)
 Dancing For The Love (feat. Eric Bazilian)
 Hard Sound (feat. Daniele Mondello)
 Hard As Hell (feat. Daniele Mondello)
 Believe In Me (feat. Bonnie Tyler)
 Everything (feat. Haddaway)
 Wild Wild Baby (feat. Haddaway)
 Sentenced
 Rock The Dolls
 Echoes 2K14 (feat. Eric Bazilian)
 Drop That Shit
 Fantasize
 Turn On The Radio (feat. Express Viviana)
 Who Is It (feat. Psytrex DJ)
 Explosion
 Hardstyle MC (feat. Danielle Mondello)
 Hardstyle & Acid Rekick (feat. Audionator)
 Brainshooter 3000
 Turn Up The Bass (EDM/Bigroom)
 Superchords
 U Got 2 Let The Bass Kick
 Holding Out For A Hero 2K15 (feat. Bonnie Tyler & Van Snyder)
 Breaking Up (feat. Chris Crusher)
 Can You Hear Me?
 Twisted (feat. Van Snyder) (EDM/Bigroom)
 Just Boof It
 Dirty Drop (EDM/Bigroom)
 Your Time (EDM/Bigroom)

Compilations 
 Blutonium pres. Hardstyle Vol. 1-2
 Blutonium pres. Hardstyle Vol. 3-4
 Blutonium pres. Hardstyle Vol. 5-7
 Blutonium pres. Hardstyle Vol. 8-10
 Blutonium pres. Hardstyle Vol. 11-13
 Blutonium pres. Hardstyle Vol. 14-15
 Blutonium pres. Hardstyle Vol. 16-18
 Blutonium & DMW pres. Hardstyle Vol. 19-21
 Blutonium & DMW pres. Hardstyle Vol. 22-24
 Blutonium & DMW pres. Hardstyle Vol. 25
 Blutonium & DMW pres. 10 Years Hardstyle
 Blutonium pres. Hardstyle Vol. 26
 Blutonium pres. Hardstyle Vol. 27

Blutonium Boy Remixes 
 Yoji Biomehanika - Monochroma (Blutonium Boy Remix)
 Mo-Do - Eins Zwei Polizei (Blutonium Boy Remix)
 Raveboy - Dancing Through The Night (Blutonium Boy Remix)
 Audionator - The Devil Inside (Blutonium Boy Remix)
 Headhunterz and Crystal Lake - Live Your Life (Blutonium Boy Remix)
 Van Snyder - Athens (Blutonium Boy Remix)

References

External links
 Blutonium Media website
 BluPile website 

German DJs
German record producers
Hardstyle musicians
Living people
1970 births
Electronic dance music DJs